Julie Leprohon (born November 30, 1980) is a Canadian fencer. She was part of the team Canada épée team who finished fourth at the 2004 Summer Olympics.

References

1980 births
Living people
Canadian female épée fencers
Olympic fencers of Canada
Fencers at the 2004 Summer Olympics
Fencers at the 2007 Pan American Games
Fencers from Montreal
French Quebecers
Pan American Games silver medalists for Canada
Pan American Games medalists in fencing
Medalists at the 2007 Pan American Games
21st-century Canadian women